South Kerry or Kerry South may refer to:

 The southern part of County Kerry, in Ireland
 South Kerry GAA, a Gaelic football Divisional Team in County Kerry
 South Kerry (UK Parliament constituency), former UK Parliament constituency
 Kerry South (Dáil constituency), former constituency for elections to Dáil Éireann